The 2014 NCAA Division I men's basketball tournament involved 68 teams playing in a single-elimination tournament to determine the national champion of men's NCAA Division I college basketball. It began on March 18, 2014, and concluded with the UConn Huskies winning the championship game on April 7 at AT&T Stadium in Arlington, Texas.

The East Regional semifinals and final were held in Madison Square Garden, the first time that arena has been used as an NCAA Tournament venue and the first time in 63 years that tournament games have been held in New York City.

With No. 7 seed UConn and No. 8 seed Kentucky reaching the championship game, this tournament's final was the first ever not to include at least one 1, 2, or 3 seed. It is also only the third final not to feature a 1 or 2 seed (1989 #3 Michigan vs. #3 Seton Hall and 2011 #3 UConn vs. #8 Butler). UConn was the first 7 seed ever to reach and win the championship game. The two teams combined for the highest seed total in championship game history with 15. The previous record (11) was held by UConn and Butler in 2011.

The next day, the UConn Huskies women's team won the women's NCAA basketball tournament, only the second time that a school has won both the men's and women's Division I national basketball championships in the same year; UConn first accomplished this in 2004.

The previous season, UConn was academically ineligible for the postseason.

Tournament procedure

For 2014 the selection committee picked a total of 68 teams that would enter the 2014 tournament, of which 32 were "automatic bids" (teams winning their conference tournaments, with the exception of the Ivy League, which does not host a post-season conference tournament; thus, its regular-season conference champion is awarded the automatic bid) while the remaining 36 were "at large" bids which were extended by the NCAA Selection Committee on the Sunday preceding the First Four play-in tournament and dubbed Selection Sunday by the media and fans.  The Selection Committee also seeded the entire field from 1 to 68.

Eight teams – the four lowest-seeded automatic qualifiers and the four lowest-seeded at-large teams – played in the First Four (the successor to what had been popularly known as "play-in games" through the 2010 tournament).  The winners of those games advanced to the main draw of the tournament.

Schedule and venues

The following are the sites selected to host each round of the 2014 tournament:

First Four
March 18 and 19
University of Dayton Arena, Dayton, Ohio (Host: University of Dayton)

Second and third rounds
March 20 and 22
First Niagara Center, Buffalo, New York (Host: Canisius College, Niagara University)
Bradley Center, Milwaukee, Wisconsin (Host: Marquette University)
Amway Center, Orlando, Florida (Host: Stetson University)
Spokane Veterans Memorial Arena, Spokane, Washington (Host: Washington State University)
March 21 and 23
PNC Arena, Raleigh, North Carolina  (Host: North Carolina State University)
AT&T Center, San Antonio, Texas (Host: University of Texas at San Antonio)
Viejas Arena, San Diego, California (Host: San Diego State University)
Scottrade Center, St. Louis, Missouri (Host: Missouri Valley Conference)

Regional semifinals and finals (Sweet Sixteen and Elite Eight)
March 27 and 29
South Regional, FedExForum, Memphis, Tennessee (Host: University of Memphis)
West Regional, Honda Center, Anaheim, California (Host: Big West Conference)
March 28 and 30
East Regional, Madison Square Garden, New York, New York  (Hosts:  St. John's University, Big East Conference)
Midwest Regional, Lucas Oil Stadium, Indianapolis, Indiana (Hosts: IUPUI, Horizon League)

National semifinals and championship (Final Four and championship)
April 5 and 7
AT&T Stadium, Arlington, Texas (Host: Big 12 Conference)

Qualified teams

Automatic qualifiers
The following teams are automatic qualifiers for the 2014 NCAA field by virtue of winning their conference's tournament (except for the Ivy League, whose regular-season champion receives the automatic bid).

Tournament seeds

Florida was the overall 1 seed for the second time, the other being 2007 when they repeated as national champions. Arizona was a 1 seed for the 6th time in school history. They lost in the West regional final for the 3rd straight time as a 1 seed, all games being played in Anaheim (also in 1998 and 2003). Virginia was a 1 seed for the 4th time in school history, their first since three straight 1 seeds in 1981, 1982, and 1983.

Bracket
* – Denotes overtime period

Unless otherwise noted, all times listed are Eastern Daylight Time (UTC-04)

First Four – Dayton, Ohio
The First Four games involved eight teams: the four overall lowest-ranked teams, and the four lowest-ranked at-large teams.

South Regional – Memphis, Tennessee

Regional Final summary

South Regional all-tournament team
Regional all-tournament team: Michael Frazier II, Florida; Devin Oliver, Dayton; Dyshawn Pierre, Dayton; Dwight Powell, Stanford

Regional most outstanding player: Scottie Wilbekin, Florida

East Regional – New York City, New York

Regional Final summary

East Regional all-tournament team
Regional all-tournament team: DeAndre Daniels, UConn; Gary Harris, Michigan State; Dustin Hogue, Iowa State; Adreian Payne, Michigan State

Regional most outstanding player: Shabazz Napier, UConn

West Regional – Anaheim, California

Regional Final summary

West Regional all-tournament team
Regional all-tournament team: Aaron Gordon, Arizona; Traevon Jackson, Wisconsin; Nick Johnson, Arizona; Xavier Thames, San Diego State

Regional most outstanding player: Frank Kaminsky, Wisconsin

Midwest Regional – Indianapolis, Indiana

Regional Final summary

Midwest Regional all-tournament team
Regional all-tournament team: Aaron Harrison, Kentucky; Marcus Lee, Kentucky; Caris LeVert, Michigan; Nik Stauskas, Michigan

Regional most outstanding player: Julius Randle, Kentucky

Final Four
During the Final Four round, regardless of the seeds of the participating teams, the champion of the top overall top seed's region plays against the champion of the fourth-ranked top seed's region, and the champion of the second overall top seed's region plays against the champion of the third-ranked top seed's region. Florida (placed in the South Regional) was selected as the top overall seed, and Virginia (in the East Regional) was named as the #4 overall seed. Thus, the South champion (Florida) played the East Champion (UConn) in one semifinal game, and the West Champion (Wisconsin) faced the Midwest Champion (Kentucky) in the other semifinal game. The overall No. 1 seed Florida lost only two games during the regular season: to West Champion Wisconsin and to East Champion (and eventual National Champion) UConn; Florida also played and beat Midwest Champion Kentucky twice during the regular season and again in the conference championship game.

Final Four – AT&T Stadium, Arlington, Texas

Game summaries

Final four

National Championship

Final Four all-tournament team
Julius Randle, Kentucky
James Young, Kentucky
Ryan Boatright, UConn
DeAndre Daniels, UConn
Shabazz Napier, UConn, Most Outstanding Player

Tournament notes
Wichita State became the first team since UNLV in 1991 to go into the tournament undefeated. The Shockers entered the tournament 34-0. Their perfect record of 35-0 (a then NCAA men's record) was spoiled by Kentucky in the third round. Kentucky in turn set an NCAA-men's-record 38 straight wins to start a season the next year.

Kentucky became the first team to field all-freshman starters at the Final Four and championship games since the 1991–92 Michigan Wolverines under the Fab Five. The 1992 Final Four and championship appearances by Michigan were subsequently vacated.  

MEAC champion North Carolina Central University and Big West champion Cal Poly made their first NCAA Division I tournament appearances.

For only the second time since 1973 no teams from the state of Indiana (a state noted for its basketball powerhouse programs) were in the tournament.

There were five overtime games in the second round of the tournament, the most overtime games ever in tournament history. In contrast, the previous two tournaments had two overtime games combined.

North Dakota State's victory against Oklahoma secured the first tournament win for the state of North Dakota. Mercer, Stephen F. Austin, Albany, and Cal Poly had their first NCAA tournament wins. Cal Poly's victory over Texas Southern marked only the third time a team with a losing record won a game in the tournament.

Upsets
Per the NCAA, "Upsets are defined as when the winner of the game was seeded five or more places lower than the team it defeated." The 2014 tournament saw a total of 13 upsets; 6 of them were in the first round, 4 of them were in the second round, none in the Sweet Sixteen, one in the Elite Eight, and 2 in the Final Four.

Record by conference

The R64, R32, S16, E8, F4, CG, and NC columns indicate how many teams from each conference were in the round of 64 (second round), round of 32 (third round), Sweet 16, Elite Eight, Final Four, championship game, and national champion, respectively.
The "Record" column includes wins in the first round (First Four) for ACC, America East, Big West, and SEC.
The "Record" column also includes losses in the first round (First Four) for Big East and Big 10.
The SWAC and NEC each had one representative, eliminated in the first round with a record of 0–1.
The MAAC, OVC, WAC, Patriot League, Colonial, Sun Belt, Big Sky, Horizon League, Big South, Southern Conference, MAC, C-USA, and MEAC each had one representative, eliminated in the second round with a record of 0–1.

Media coverage

Television
The year 2014 marked the fourth year of a 14-year partnership between CBS and Turner cable networks TBS, TNT and truTV to cover the entire tournament under the NCAA March Madness banner. TBS aired the Final Four for the first year since CBS' 32 consecutive years of airing. The tournament was considered a ratings success. Tournament games averaged 10.5 million viewers, and the championship game garnered an average of 21.2 million viewers and a peak viewership of 24.3 million.

First Four truTV
Second and third rounds CBS, TBS, TNT, and truTV
Regional semifinals and Finals (Sweet Sixteen and Elite Eight) CBS and TBS
National semifinals (Final Four) TBS, TNT, truTV
TBS provided traditional coverage; TNT and truTV each gave team-specific broadcasts. 
National Championship CBS

Studio hosts

Greg Gumbel (New York City and Arlington) – Second Round, Third round, Regionals, Final Four and National Championship Game
Ernie Johnson Jr. (New York City, Atlanta and Arlington) – Second Round, Third round, Regional Semi-Finals, Final Four and National Championship Game
Matt Winer (Atlanta) – First Four, second round and third round

Studio analysts

Charles Barkley (New York City and Arlington) – Second Round, Third round, Regionals, Final Four and National Championship Game
Mateen Cleaves (New York City) – Third round
Seth Davis (Atlanta and Arlington) – First Four, second round, Third round, Regional Semi-Finals, Final Four and National Championship Game
Doug Gottlieb (Atlanta) – Regional Semi-Finals
Grant Hill (Atlanta and Arlington) – First Four, second round, Third round, Regional Semi-Finals, Final Four and National Championship Game
Clark Kellogg (New York City and Arlington) – Second Round, Third round, Regionals, Final Four and National Championship Game
Reggie Miller (Arlington) – Final Four
Kenny Smith (New York City and Arlington) – Second Round, Third round, Regionals, Final Four and National Championship Game
Steve Smith (Atlanta) – First Four, second round, Third round and Regional Semi-Finals
Buzz Williams (New York City) – Third round

Commentary teams

Jim Nantz/Greg Anthony/Steve Kerr/Tracy Wolfson – Second and third round at St. Louis, Missouri; Midwest Regional at Indianapolis, Indiana; Final Four at Arlington, TexasKerr joined Nantz and Anthony during the Final Four and National Championship games
Marv Albert/Steve Kerr/Craig Sager – Second and third round at San Antonio, Texas; West Regional at Anaheim, California
Verne Lundquist/Bill Raftery/Allie LaForce – Second and third round at Buffalo, New York; East Regional at New York City, New York
Kevin Harlan/Len Elmore/Reggie Miller/Rachel Nichols – First Four at Dayton, Ohio; Second and third round at Raleigh, North Carolina; South Regional at Memphis, Tennessee
Ian Eagle/Jim Spanarkel/Lewis Johnson – Second and third round at Milwaukee, Wisconsin
Brian Anderson/Dan Bonner/Kristine Leahy – First Four at Dayton, Ohio; Second and third round at Orlando, Florida
Spero Dedes/Doug Gottlieb/Jaime Maggio – Second and third round at Spokane, Washington
Andrew Catalon/Mike Gminski/Otis Livingston – Second and third round at San Diego, California

Team casts
For the first time in the history of the tournament, Turner broadcast the semifinals. TBS aired the traditional neutral broadcast (with Nantz/Anthony/Kerr/Wolfson commentator set that is also being used for CBS's national championship coverage). However, Turner also distributed team-centered broadcasts for the Final Four broadcasts on TNT and truTV. The announcers for these broadcasts are as follows: 
David Steele/Mark Wise/James Bates Florida Teamcast on TNT
Eric Frede/Donny Marshall/Swin Cash UConn Teamcast on truTV
Rob Bromley/Rex Chapman/Dave Baker Kentucky Teamcast on TNT
Wayne Larrivee/Mike Kelley/Phil Dawson Wisconsin Teamcast on truTV

International
ESPN International distributes broadcast rights to the tournament outside the United States, and will produce separate international broadcasts of the semi-final and championship games with announcers Dan Shulman (play-by-play), Dick Vitale (analyst for the final and one semi-final), and Jay Bilas (analyst for the other semi-final). For the initial rounds, they use CBS/Turner coverage with an additional host to transition between games, with whiparound coverage similar to the CBS-only era. ESPN also has exclusive digital rights to the NCAA tournament outside of North America.

In Canada, the broadcasting rights are with TSN. In The Philippines it's aired on TV5.

Radio
Westwood One has exclusive national radio rights to the entire tournament. Team radio networks also hold the rights to broadcast their teams through their entire progression within the tournament and no flagship restrictions. However men's team radio networks cannot stream the games online during the NCAA tournament. WestwoodOne is the only group authorized to stream the tournament online.

First Four

John Tautges and Kyle Macy – at Dayton, Ohio

Second and Third rounds

Gary Cohen and Kevin Grevey – Buffalo, New York
Wayne Larrivee and Kelly Tripucka – Milwaukee, Wisconsin
Tom McCarthy and Donny Marshall – Orlando, Florida
Ted Robinson and P. J. Carlesimo – Spokane, Washington
Scott Graham and John Thompson – Raleigh, North Carolina
Brad Sham and Will Perdue – San Antonio, Texas
Dave Sims and Bill Frieder – San Diego, California
Kevin Kugler and Jim Jackson – St. Louis, Missouri

Regionals

Ian Eagle and John Thompson – East Regional at New York City, New York
Kevin Kugler and P. J. Carlesimo – Midwest Regional at Indianapolis, Indiana
Gary Cohen and Will Perdue – South Regional at Memphis, Tennessee
Ted Robinson and Bill Frieder – West Regional at Anaheim, California

Final four

Kevin Kugler, John Thompson, Bill Raftery, and Jim Gray – Arlington, Texas

See also
 2014 NCAA Division II men's basketball tournament
 2014 NCAA Division III men's basketball tournament
 2014 NCAA Division I women's basketball tournament
 2014 NCAA Division II women's basketball tournament
 2014 NCAA Division III women's basketball tournament
 2014 National Invitation Tournament
 2014 Women's National Invitation Tournament
 2014 NAIA Division I men's basketball tournament
 2014 NAIA Division II men's basketball tournament
 2014 NAIA Division I women's basketball tournament
 2014 NAIA Division II women's basketball tournament
 2014 College Basketball Invitational
 2014 CollegeInsider.com Postseason Tournament

Notes

References

NCAA Division I men's basketball tournament
NCAA Division I men's basketball tournament
NCAA Division I men's basketball tournament
NCAA Division I men's basketball tournament
NCAA Division I men's basketball tournament
Basketball competitions in Anaheim, California
Basketball competitions in New York City
Sports competitions in Arlington, Texas
21st century in Arlington, Texas
Basketball competitions in Dayton, Ohio
Basketball competitions in Memphis, Tennessee
Basketball competitions in Indianapolis
Basketball in the Dallas–Fort Worth metroplex
Basketball competitions in San Antonio